The Jaguar (also called Jabiru {stork}) was a three-stage British sounding rocket built in several versions.

The first stage of the Jabiru Mk.1 was 5.6 m long and had a takeoff weight of 1,170 kilograms, of which about 866 kilograms were fuel. The second stage of the Jabiru Mk.1 weighed 292 kilograms, of which 184 kilograms were allotted to fuel. The third stage contained 26 kilograms of fuel. In all stages solid fuel was used. The complete rocket was 12 meters long. The Jabiru Mk.1 was launched several times between 1960 and 1964 at the aerospace testing area at Woomera, South Australia. 

The follow-up version, the Jabiru Mk.2, contained an improved starting stage and a second stage with 307 kilograms of fuel as well as a third stage with 190 kilograms fuel. The Jabiru Mk.2 was launched ten times at Woomera between 1964 and 1970. This rocket was replaced by the Jabiru Mk.3 which used a modified first stage of the Jabiru Mk.2 as second stage, while the first stage remained unchanged. No third stage was used on the Mk.3. The Jabiru Mk.3 was used for re-entry experiments between 1971 and 1974.

External links
https://web.archive.org/web/20050209210125/http://astronautix.com/lvs/jagarrtv.htm

Experimental rockets
Sounding rockets of the United Kingdom
History of science and technology in the United Kingdom